Jean-Yves Cheutin (born 11 September 1974, in Oyonnax) is a French slalom canoeist who competed at the international level from 1992 to 2003. He retired in 2004 and became a national team coach.

Cheutin finished 23rd in the K1 event at the 1996 Summer Olympics in Atlanta.

World Cup individual podiums

References

1974 births
Living people
People from Oyonnax
Canoeists at the 1996 Summer Olympics
French male canoeists
Olympic canoeists of France
Sportspeople from Ain